In mathematics, more specifically in abstract algebra, the commutator subgroup or derived subgroup of a group is the subgroup generated by all the commutators of the group.

The commutator subgroup is important because it is the smallest normal subgroup such that the quotient group of the original group by this subgroup is abelian. So in some sense it provides a measure of how far the group is from being abelian; the larger the commutator subgroup is, the "less abelian" the group is.

Commutators 

The commutator  is equal to the identity element e if and only if  , that is, if and only if  and  commute. In general, .

However, the notation is somewhat arbitrary and there is a non-equivalent variant definition for the commutator that has the inverses on the right hand side of the equation:  in which case   but instead .

An element of G of the form  for some g and h is called a commutator.  The identity element e = [e,e] is always a commutator, and it is the only commutator if and only if G is abelian.

Here are some simple but useful commutator identities, true for any elements s, g, h of a group G:

 
 for any homomorphism , 

The first and second identities imply that the set of commutators in G is closed under inversion and conjugation.  If in the third identity we take H = G, we get that the set of commutators is stable under any endomorphism of G.  This is in fact a generalization of the second identity, since we can take f to be the conjugation automorphism on G, to get the second identity.

However, the product of two or more commutators need not be a commutator.  A generic example is [a,b][c,d] in the free group on a,b,c,d.  It is known that the least order of a finite group for which there exists two commutators whose product is not a commutator is 96; in fact there are two nonisomorphic groups of order 96 with this property.

Definition 
This motivates the definition of the commutator subgroup  (also called the derived subgroup, and denoted  or ) of G: it is the subgroup generated by all the commutators.

for some natural number , where the gi and hi are elements of G.  Moreover, since , the commutator subgroup is normal in G.  For any homomorphism f: G → H,

,

so that .

This shows that the commutator subgroup can be viewed as a functor on the category of groups, some implications of which are explored below.  Moreover, taking G = H it shows that the commutator subgroup is stable under every endomorphism of G: that is, [G,G] is a fully characteristic subgroup of G, a property considerably stronger than normality.

The commutator subgroup can also be defined as the set of elements g of the group that have an expression as a product g = g1 g2 ... gk that can be rearranged to give the identity.

Derived series 
This construction can be iterated:

The groups  are called the second derived subgroup, third derived subgroup, and so forth, and the descending normal series

is called the derived series.

For a finite group, the derived series terminates in a perfect group, which may or may not be trivial. For an infinite group, the derived series need not terminate at a finite stage, and one can continue it to infinite ordinal numbers via transfinite recursion, thereby obtaining the transfinite derived series, which eventually terminates at the perfect core of the group.

Abelianization 
Given a group , a quotient group  is abelian if and only if .

There is a useful categorical interpretation of the map . As usual for objects defined by universal mapping properties, this shows the uniqueness of the abelianization  up to canonical isomorphism, whereas the explicit construction  shows existence.

The abelianization functor is the left adjoint of the inclusion functor from the category of abelian groups to the category of groups. The existence of the abelianization functor Grp → Ab makes the category Ab a reflective subcategory of the category of groups, defined as a full subcategory whose inclusion functor has a left adjoint. 

Classes of groups 
A group  is an abelian group if and only if the derived group is trivial: [G,G] = {e}. Equivalently, if and only if the group equals its abelianization. See above for the definition of a group's abelianization.

A group  is a perfect group if and only if the derived group equals the group itself: [G,G] = G. Equivalently, if and only if the abelianization of the group is trivial. This is "opposite" to abelian.

Perfect group 

Whenever a group  has derived subgroup equal to itself, it is called a perfect group. This includes non-abelian simple groups and the special linear groups  for a fixed field .

Examples 
 The commutator subgroup of any abelian group is trivial.
 The commutator subgroup of the general linear group  over a field or a division ring k equals the special linear group  provided that  or k is not the field with two elements.
 The commutator subgroup of the alternating group A4 is the Klein four group.
 The commutator subgroup of the symmetric group Sn is the alternating group An.
 The commutator subgroup of the quaternion group Q = {1, −1, i, −i, j, −j, k, −k} is [Q,Q] = {1, −1}.
 The commutator subgroup of the fundamental group π1(X) of a path-connected topological space X is the kernel of the natural homomorphism onto the first singular homology group H1(X).

Map from Out 
Since the derived subgroup is characteristic, any automorphism of G induces an automorphism of the abelianization. Since the abelianization is abelian, inner automorphisms act trivially, hence this yields a map

See also
Solvable group
Nilpotent group
The abelianization H/H' of a subgroup H < G of finite index (G:H) is the target of the Artin transfer T(G,H).

Notes

References

External links
 

Group theory
Functional subgroups
Articles containing proofs
Subgroup properties